Phyllonorycter christenseni is a moth of the family Gracillariidae. It is known from Greece.

References

christenseni
Moths of Europe
Moths described in 1985